Daniel Florea may refer to:

Daniel Florea (politician)
Daniel Florea (footballer, born 1975)
Daniel Florea (footballer, born 1988)